The 1956 All-Ireland Senior Football Championship was played from May to October, 1956. Kerry entered the championship as the defending champions, however, they were defeated by Cork in a Munster final replay.
Galway were the winners, defeating Cork in the final.

Results

Connacht Senior Football Championship

Leinster Senior Football Championship

Munster Senior Football Championship

Ulster Senior Football Championship

All-Ireland Senior Football Championship

Championship statistics

Miscellaneous

 Kildare win their first Leinster title since 1935 and was their last until 1998.
 Tyrone win their first Ulster title.
 The All Ireland semi-final between Galway and Tyrone was their first meeting between the 2 teams.
 The All Ireland final between Galway and Cork gave Galway won their 4th All Ireland title on the day after a 3 in a row of defeats between (1940-1942).
 An outbreak of polio in Cork and the fear of a spread of the disease to Dublin due to an influx of Cork supporters lead to the postponement of the All-Ireland final until 7 October 1956.

All-Ireland Senior Football Championship